Brecon and Radnorshire may refer to:

 Brecon and Radnorshire (UK Parliament constituency)
 Brecon and Radnorshire (Senedd constituency)